Khwarranzem (Middle Persian: Xwarranzēm) was a 3rd-century Sasanian queen (banbishn), married to Ardashir I or to Shapur I.

Biography 
The origins of her name is unknown, the name seems to suggest an Armenian or Georgian background. She is mentioned in Shapur I's inscription at the Ka'ba-ye Zartosht, where she is holding the title of shahr banbishn ("Queen of the empire"). According to the same inscription, she was the mother of a certain Gorazdukht.

Her husband is the subject of dispute amongst scholars; according to some, she was the wife of Ardashir I, whilst others suggests that she was the wife of Ardashir's son and successor Shapur I and the mother of the latters son and heir Hormizd I. She may have been the same person as Gurdzad, who is mentioned as the wife of Shapur by the 10th-century historian Hamza al-Isfahani.

Sources

External links 

Sasanian queens
3rd-century Iranian people
3rd-century deaths
3rd-century women